Hugh Douglas, Earl of Ormonde (died 1455) was a Scottish Soldier and nobleman, a member of the powerful Black Douglases.

He was the fourth son of James the Gross, 7th Earl of Douglas and his wife Beatrice, daughter of Henry II Sinclair, Earl of Orkney. He was a younger brother of William Douglas, 8th Earl of Douglas, James Douglas, 9th Earl of Douglas, Archibald Douglas, Earl of Moray and older to John Douglas, Lord of Balvenie.

Life
He was created Earl of Ormonde before 1445 when he attended a meeting of the Parliament of Scotland, under that title. He received from his brother the 8th Earl, the lands of Rattray, Aberdour, and Crimond in Aberdeenshire, that of Dunsyre, Lanarkshire, and those of Ardmanach (Modern Redcastle, between Tore and Muir of Ord) and Ormonde, (modern day Avoch) in Invernesshire.

He led the Scots to victory at the Battle of Sark, against a scion of the old Douglas enemy, Henry Percy, 2nd Earl of Northumberland. Ormonde was left in control of the vast Douglas estates when his brother went on pilgrimage to Rome in 1450. Following the assassination of his eldest brother by the hand of the King, James II, Ormonde along with his brothers renounced their allegiance to the King and went into open rebellion.

The brothers, excepting the new 9th Earl, faced the Royal forces at the Battle of Arkinholm. The royal army led by a kinsman George Douglas, 4th Earl of Angus, defeated the Black Douglas brethren. Moray  dying of his wounds, Balveny escaped, Ormonde, however was captured, tried and executed, his estates forfeit.

Issue
Ormonde had by an unknown wife, one child:
Hugh Douglas, became Dean of Brechin Cathedral

References

Notes

Sources
Balfour Paul, Sir JamesThe Scots Peerage IX vols. Edinburgh, 1907 

Scottish soldiers
Earls of Ormond
Peers created by James II of Scotland
1455 deaths
Executed Scottish people
People executed by Stuart Scotland
Year of birth unknown
15th-century executions
Younger sons of earls